Alison Bruce (born 1962) is a New Zealand television and film actress, who starred in the 1999 feature Magik and Rose. She also appeared in the teen series Being Eve, Xena: Warrior Princess and had a recurring role as Simula in Young Hercules.

Life and career
Bruce was born in Tanzania to a Scottish father and an English mother. Her family moved to New Zealand when she was around eight. After training at Auckland's Theatre Corporate in the early 1980s, she began a busy acting career with stage roles that include starring in Hamlet (as Ophelia) and Cyrano de Bergerac (as Roxane).

Bruce made her screen debut in the 1984 teleplay The Minders. Since then she has acted in more than 30 screen roles, including sizeable parts in two feature films: the 1990  chase comedy User Friendly, in which her character steals a keenly-sought dog statue from a crazed former boss; and 2001 feature Magik and Rose, which Bruce later described as a turning point in terms of the type of roles she is offered. The comedy-drama saw Bruce playing Magik, a fortune-teller who arrives in a Kiwi town in a house-truck, seeking the daughter she gave up for adoption many years before.

Bruce also acted in the based-on-a-true-story feature The World's Fastest Indian (as a doctor) and the short film Mon Desir, which was selected to play in the Un Certain Regard section of the 1992 Cannes Film Festival.

Television

Bruce's television roles include the eccentric mother of Eve, the main character in award-winning series Being Eve, and the hospital personal assistant who falls pregnant in Mercy Peak. The latter part would win Bruce two consecutive New Zealand television awards for best supporting actor. She also had a number of small roles on the Xena: Warrior Princess and Hercules: The Legendary Journeys franchise, including playing an Amazon Queen (Queen Melosa). Bruce enjoyed the chance to take part in fight scenes, and "do all this stuff you normally don't get to do in television".

Bruce played estranged mother to a family of gods in the first two seasons (2010–2011) of the television series The Almighty Johnsons, and worked with New Zealand director Jane Campion on the 2012 series Top of the Lake.

Filmography

Film

Television

Awards and nominations

References

External links
 
 Alison Bruce FanSite
 An interview with Alison Bruce

1962 births
Living people
New Zealand film actresses
New Zealand television actresses
New Zealand people of English descent
New Zealand people of Scottish descent
People from Auckland
20th-century New Zealand actresses
21st-century New Zealand actresses
Women mystery writers